Aagaard is a manor house and estate located at Gørlev, Kalundborg Municipality, 100 kilometres west of Copenhagen, Denmark. It was established in 1660 by treasurer Henrik Müller and has since 1865 been owned by members of the Hellemann family. The main building was listed on the Danish registry of protected buildings and places in 1945.

History

17th-century
 
In the late 16th century, the name Aagaardene (plural) referred to two farms located adjacent to the stream  Halleby Å. They were later merged into one estate under the name Aagaard. Henrik Müller expanded the estate with a farm that had previously belonged to Ågerup. He was one of the largest landowners in the country. In 1660, Aagaard was converted into a manor in return for Müller's loans to the state during the Second Northern War.

The estateLejregaard was also establsihed by Müller. The two estates were after his death both passed to his daughter, Drude Müller. She married Thomas von Fincke, who was out of a wealthy noble family from Sønderjylland. He served as prefect of Bornholm and died in a riding accident at Hammershus in 1677. Aagaard was therefore passed on to their son Henrik von Fincke. His widow,  Karen Gyldensparre, ceded it to their son-in-law  Rasmus Melvin, the owner of Nørager.

18th-century
 
Rasmus Melvin sold Aagaard to Lars Benzon in 1721. In 1725 he sold it to his brother, Jacob Benzon, who would later become Governor-General of Norway. A third brother, Peder Benzon, acquired it in 1731.

After Peder Bensezon's death, Aagaard was sold at auction to Major-General  Peter Scavenius for 18,000 Danish rigsdaler. His widow,  Helle Benzon, a more distant relative of the previous owners, kept the estate after his death two years later. In 1753, it was acquired by William Hammond, a merchant from Trondheimm for 30,000 rigsdaler.

 
In 1762, Aagaard was acquired by kommerceråd Hans Lindholm for 52,000 rigsdaler. In 1781, he sold the estate to Christian Lindam for 59,750 rigsdaler.

Peter Paul Ferdinand Mourier purchased Aagaard for 70,000 rigsdaler in 1787. He had a background as a naval officer but had more recently worked for the Danish Asiatic Company in Canton. After his return to Denmark in 1785, he had been appointed as member of fabriksdirektionen, a subcommittee of the Commercial College (Kommerskollegiet), tasked with improving the productivity of the royal manufacturies. He now retired to his estate where he improved the management of the estate considerably and expanded it with the farm Søgaard.

sold Aagaard in 1796 and moved back to Copenhagen. He then acquired Bjerregaarden in Valby and nearby farms. The new owner of Aagaard was Chancellery secretary  Iver Quistgaard.

The Moltke family
 
Aagaard was in 1803 purchased by Bjelke and Joachim Moltke for 165,000 rigsdaler. Carl Emil Moltke, Joachim Moltke, acquired it the following year. He had embarked on a career in the diplomacy and therefore spent most of his time abroad, serving as Danish envoy in Stockholm, the Hague and London, but settled on the estate after his retirement from diplomacy in 1822. He bought Nørager in 1837 and spent most of his time on his second estate during the last part of his year. He was a member of Roskilde Provincial Assembly (Roskilde Stænderforsamling) in 1835–46 .

Carl Emil Moltke's son, Ernst Moltke, an only child, inherited Aagaard, Nørager and Conradinelyst after his father in 1858. He, too, preferred Nørager to Aagaard.

The Hellemann family
Adam Georg Ernst Henrik Moltke transferred Aagaard's tenant farms to Nørager in 1865. Aagaard, Søgaard, a number of houses and the churches in Gørlev and Helsinge were sold to J. Hellemann. The estate is still owned by his descendants.

Architecture
The main building is a three-winged, single-storey complex. Part of the south wing dates from 1605. The central wing has been lengthened several times. The north wing was built in 1911.

List of owners
 (1660- ) Henrik Müller 
 ( -1677) Thomas von Fincke 
 (1677–1705) Henrik von Fincke 
 (1705–1711) Karen Gyldensparre 
 (1711–1719) The estate of  Karen Gyldensparre 
 (1719–1721) R. Melvin 
 (1721–1725) Lars Benzon 
 (1725–1731) Jacob Benzon 
 (1731–1737) Peder Benzon 
 (1737) The estate of Peder Benzon 
 (1737- ) Peder Scavenius 
 ( -1753) Helene Benzon, gift Scavenius 
 (1753–1762) William Hammond 
 (1762–1781) Hans Lindholm 
 (1781–1787) Christian Linddam 
 (1787–1796) Peter Paul Ferdinand Mourier 
 (1796–1803) Iver Quistgaard 
 (1803–1804) Bielke greve Moltke 
 (1803–1804) Joachim greve Moltke 
 (1804–1858) Carl Emil greve Moltke 
 (1858–1865) Emil greve Moltke 
 (1865–1899) J. Hellemann 
 (1899–1900) Boet efter J. Hellemann 
 (1900– ) Johannes Olsen 
 ( -1911) Enken efter Hellemann, gift Olsen 
 (1911–1935) J. Hellemann Olsen 
 (1935–1968) Johannes Jørgen Hellemann Olsen 
 (1968–1996) J. H. Hellemann Olsen 
 (1996–2007) John Hellemann Olsen 
 (2007– ) Gregers John Hellemann

References

External links
 Source

Listed buildings and structures in Kalundborg Municipality
1660 establishments in Denmark
Manor houses in Kalundborg Municipality
Buildings and structures associated with the Benzon  family
Buildings and structures in Denmark associated with the Moltke family